Ere Ijesa (coord. 7°43'13.9"N 4°47'22.6"E) is a town in Oriade Local Government Area of Osun State, Nigeria.

There are seventeen airports in the area of Ere Ijesa. Akure Airport (IATA: AKR) is 48 miles (77.4 km) south-east of city center, and it is the best airport in town.

Populated places in Osun State